A Small World is a 2003 Serbian comedy film directed by Milos Radović.

Cast 
 Miki Manojlović - Dr. Filip Kostic 
 Lazar Ristovski - Stariji vodnik Ras
 Branko Đurić - Osumnjiceni 
 Bogdan Diklić - Mladji vodnik Kos
 Irena Micijevic - Marija Dekleva 
 Ana Sofrenovic - Dr. Ana Kostic
 Milorad Mandić - Policajac na motoru
 Aleksa Bastovanovic - Filipov nerodjeni sin Ogi
 Rade Marković - Stari doktor
 Olivera Marković - Baba na groblju
 Milan Gutović - Svestenik
 Petar Kralj - Lekar hitne pomoci

External links 

2003 comedy films
2003 films
Serbian comedy films
Films set in Serbia
Films shot in Serbia
2000s Serbian-language films